Van Horn High School is a public high school located in Van Horn, Texas (USA) and classified as a 1A school by the UIL. It is part of the Culberson County-Allamoore Independent School District located in southwest Culberson County and serves students countywide. In 2015, the school was rated "Met Standard" by the Texas Education Agency.

Athletics
The Van Horn Eagles compete in the following sports:

Baseball
Basketball
Cross Country
Six-man football
Golf
Softball
Tennis
Track and Field
Volleyball

Eagle Field
In 2014, Van Horn High School replaced their old grass football field with a new stadium that included a Matrix Synthetic Turf system and an Epic Tracks V300 400 meter track. The construction also included a new field house complete with weight room. The cost of the project, according to various sources, was somewhere between $4.2 and $6 million.

State Titles
Baseball 
1991(2A)
Boys Basketball 
1971(1A)
One Act Play 
1983(2A)
Girls Track & Field
2014(1A Div 1)
UIL Calculator Applications
1989-90 (2A)-Keith Taylor
1990-91 (2A)-Keith Taylor

References

External links
Culberson County-Allamoore  ISD

Public high schools in Texas